Nitta may refer to:

Places
 Nitta, Sweden, a locality in Ulricehamn Municipality, Västra Götaland County of Sweden
 Nitta, Gunma; a.k.a. Nitta, Nitta, Gunma, Japan. A town in the district of Nitta of the prefecture of Gunma in Japan 
 Nitta District, Gunma; a.k.a. Nitta, Gunma, Japan. A district in the prefecture of Gunma in Japan

People
 Nitta clan (新田氏), a major noble family in medieval Japan
 Minamoto no Yoshishige a.k.a. Nitta Tarō (1135–1202), founder of the Nitta clan
 Nitta Yoshisada (1301–1338), samurai commander
 Nitta Yoshiaki (died 1337), samurai
 Nitta Yoshioki (died 1358), samurai
 Nitta Yoshimune (1335–1368), samurai commander
 Nitta Yoshisuke (1305–1340), samurai
Nitta Oyako (Hiroshi and Masahiro), Japanese music act
Akeomi Nitta (born 1973), Japanese kickboxer
Daisuke Nitta (born 1980), Japanese football player
Emi Nitta (born 1985), Japanese voice actress
Eri Nitta (born 1968), Japanese singer
Sandra Nitta (born 1949), American swimmer
Youka Nitta (born 1971), Japanese yaoi manga artist
Yudai Nitta (born 1986), Japanese track cyclist

Characters
Kazuya Nitta, a character in Ginban Kaleidoscope
Shun Nitta, a character in Captain Tsubasa

Other
 Nitta Station, multiple train stations in Japan
 Nitta Maru (the ship "Nitta"), former name of the Japanese aircraft carrier Chūyō

See also

Netta (disambiguation)
 Nitto (disambiguation)
 Nitti (disambiguation)